In chemistry, the term stannate refers to compounds of tin (Sn). Stannic acid (Sn(OH)4), the formal precursor to stannates, does not exist and is actually a hydrate of SnO2.

In materials science, two kinds of tin oxyanions are distinguished:
orthostannates contain discrete  units (e.g. K4SnO4) or have a spinel structure (e.g. Mg2SnO4)
metastannates with a stoichiometry MIISnO3, MSnO3 which may contain polymeric anions or may be sometimes better described as mixed oxides

These materials are semiconductors.

Examples
 Barium stannate, BaSnO3 (a metastannate)
 Cobalt stannate, Co2SnO4, primary constituent of the pigment cerulean blue
 Dysprosium stannate, Dy2Sn2O7
 Lead stannate, Pb2SnO4, "Type I" lead-tin yellow
 Potassium stannate, formally potassium hexahydroxostannate(IV), formula K2Sn(OH)6
 Sodium stannate, formally sodium hexahydroxostannate(IV), formula Na2Sn(OH)6

See also
Stannite

References

 
Oxometallates